Maizidian Subdistrict is a subdistrict of Chaoyang District, Beijing. It borders Taiyanggong Township to the north, Jiangtai Township to the northeast, Dongfeng Township to the north, Tuanjiehu and Liulitun Subdistricts to the south, Sanlitun Subdistrict to the west, and Zuojiazhuang Subdistrict to the northwest. As of 2020, it has a total population of 30,143.

History 
The subdistrict was formed in 1987, when Nongzhan Nanli, Xiaguangli, Quanguo Nongye Zhanlanguan Communities were separated from their respective subdistricts and merged into the Maizidian Subdistrict.

Administrative Divisions 
Up to the end of 2021, there are 7 communities within the subdistrict:

Landmark 

 Chaoyang Park

See also
List of township-level divisions of Beijing

References

Chaoyang District, Beijing
Subdistricts of Beijing